Chitty Bang Bang was the informal name of a number of celebrated British racing cars, built and raced by Count Louis Zborowski and his engineer Clive Gallop in the 1920s, which inspired the book, film and stage musical Chitty-Chitty-Bang-Bang.

The Chittys were built in Canterbury, Kent and stored at Higham Park, Zborowski's country house at Bridge near Canterbury. The cars were so loud that Canterbury reportedly passed a by-law prohibiting them from entering within the city walls. The origin of the name "Chitty Bang Bang" is disputed, but may have been inspired by aeronautical engineer Letitia Chitty, the sound of an idling aeroplane engine or from a salacious World War I song.

Chitty 1
Chitty 1 was a chain-driven customised Mercedes chassis containing a 23-litre 6-cylinder Maybach aero-engine. It won two races at its debut at Brooklands in 1921, coming second to another Zborowski car in a sprint race at the same event. Chitty 1 was fitted with four seats and a crude, oversized exhaust pipe, in order to mislead the handicappers and spectators. Its top speed on the day was 100.75 miles per hour (162.14 km/h).

For its next outing, Chitty 1 was refitted, as a two-seater with a cowled radiator and a properly plumbed exhaust. It subsequently crashed, removing three fingers from a timing official. The car was rebuilt, and passed into the ownership of the sons of Arthur Conan Doyle, but was quickly retired as a racing car, and was later bought for spare parts by John Morris, the Maybach engine being offered to Bill Boddy, editor of Motor Sport magazine.

Chitty 2
Chitty 2 had a shorter wheelbase, an 18.8-litre Benz Bz.IV aero-engine and the coachwork was carried out by Bligh Brothers of Canterbury, England. It was never as successful as its predecessor, but took part in several road races, including a Sahara Desert expedition in 1922. It later became the property of the Crawford Auto-Aviation Museum in Cleveland, Ohio. It is now part of the private collection of Bob Bahre at his home in Paris Hill, Maine (the former mansion of Hannibal Hamlin, Lincoln's first Vice-President).

Chitty 3
Chitty 3 was based on a modified Mercedes chassis with a  Mercedes single-overhead-camshaft six-cylinder aero engine, tuned to produce . Louis Zborowski later used it as his personal transport, and drove it to Stuttgart when he negotiated to join the Mercedes racing team.

Chitty 4

Chitty 4 (also known as the Higham Special) was Louis Zborowski's largest car. Using a  V12 Liberty aero engine of 27 litres capacity, with a gearbox and chain-drive from a pre-war Blitzen Benz, it was the largest capacity racing car ever to run at Brooklands. Still not fully developed by the time of Zborowski's death in November 1924, it was purchased from his estate by J.G. Parry-Thomas for the sum of £125, equal to £ today.

Parry-Thomas rechristened the car Babs and rebuilt it with four Zenith carburettors and his own design of pistons. In April 1926, Parry-Thomas used the car to win the land speed record at 171.02 mph (273.6 km/h). However, he was killed in the vehicle in a later attempt on 3 March 1927.  Babs was buried at Pendine Sands in Wales, but was later recovered and restored and remained on display at the Pendine Museum of Speed during the summer until its demolition in 2019 and will return when the new Sands of Speed Museum is finished. It is displayed at Brooklands Museum during the winter.

References

External links
 .
 .
 .

Racing cars
Cars powered by aircraft engines
Chitty Chitty Bang Bang